Kickin' It is an American comedy television series created by Jim O'Doherty that aired on Disney XD from June 13, 2011 to March 25, 2015. The series stars Leo Howard, Dylan Riley Snyder, Mateo Arias, Olivia Holt, Alex Christian Jones, and Jason Earles.

Series overview

Episodes

Season 1 (2011–12)

Season 2 (2012)

Season 3 (2013–14)

Season 4 (2014–15)

See also 
 List of Kickin' It characters''

References 

Lists of American children's television series episodes
Lists of American comedy television series episodes
Lists of Disney Channel television series episodes